New Horton is a Canadian rural community in Albert County, New Brunswick.  New Horton is on Route 915. Its population is approximately 100, with a church, a cemetery and it is approximately an hour from Moncton.

History

Notable people

See also
List of communities in New Brunswick

References

Communities in Albert County, New Brunswick